Trochulus striolatus, previously known as Trichia striolata, common name the "strawberry snail," is a species of small, air-breathing land snail, a terrestrial pulmonate gastropod mollusk in the family Hygromiidae.

This species of snail uses love darts before mating.

Description
The  11–15 mm. shell is globular with a depressed, low, conical spire. The whorls are convex, with quite deep sutures. The last whorl is angled on the periphery. The colour is whitish to yellow-brown or red-brown with irregular growth lines and often a pale band on the angled periphery. The adult shell is hairless but bears scattered coarse hairs when juvenile.

Distribution 
This snail is native to northwestern Europe, occurring in:

 British Isles: Great Britain and Ireland
 Netherlands
 Slovakia

The distribution of the subspecies Trochulus striolatus danubialis is Danubian.

References

External links
Trochulus striolatus at Animalbase taxonomy,short description, distribution, biology,status (threats), images 
 Taxonomy at: 
 UK Nature image of a live snail of this species

Hygromiidae
Gastropods described in 1828